Seehausen (Altmark) is a Verbandsgemeinde ("collective municipality") in the district of Stendal, in Saxony-Anhalt, Germany. Before 1 January 2010, it was a Verwaltungsgemeinschaft. The seat of the Verbandsgemeinde is in Seehausen.

The Verbandsgemeinde Seehausen (Altmark) consists of the following municipalities:

Aland 
Altmärkische Höhe 
Altmärkische Wische 
Seehausen
Zehrental

References

Verbandsgemeinden in Saxony-Anhalt